Jayne Elizabeth Roylance (née Ward) (1947-2018) was a lawn bowls international for England.

Bowls career
She won a silver medal in the women's triples with Norma Shaw and Barbara Fuller during the 1988 World Outdoor Bowls Championship in Auckland.

Two years later she won a bronze medal in the pairs with Mary Price at the Commonwealth Games and four years later Roylance represented England in the fours event, at the 1994 Commonwealth Games in Victoria, British Columbia, Canada.

In addition she has also won three National titles and one national competition representing Norfolk.

Family
Her brothers Chris Ward and David Ward were both international players.

References

English female bowls players
1947 births
2018 deaths
Commonwealth Games bronze medallists for England
Bowls players at the 1990 Commonwealth Games
Bowls players at the 1994 Commonwealth Games
Commonwealth Games medallists in lawn bowls
Medallists at the 1990 Commonwealth Games